A light table is a viewing device that is used to review photographic film or artwork placed on top of it. A horizontal form of a self-standing lightbox, it provides even illumination of the subject from below through a translucent cover and fluorescent lights that emit little heat.

Some light tables may be like big light boxes horizontally standing on some type of support (legs) allowing to lay sheets of paper or films on their work surface to easily view or trace them while being comfortably seated on an office chair, but others are big complicated affairs with stereoscopes integrated as an autosupported unit. That kind is used by Tomcat TARPS squadrons for interpreting aerial photographs.

They are mainly used in the trades of graphics to trace designs, especially in the world of cartoon or comics. Another use is for example to review film negatives, photoliths or any kind of artwork that can be placed on top of a table for working with it.

In general: professional tracing, animation, cartoons, design and drawing creation, education, architecture, interior design, fashion, in hospitals for viewing radiographs (X-rays, MRI, etc. ..)

Tactical Airborne Reconnaissance Pod System
Tactical Airborne Reconnaissance Pod System squadrons were staffed with Navy photographers mates that maintained the cameras and worked with the carrier to process the imagery. TARPS squadrons also included an extra Intelligence officer and Intelligence Specialists to help plan TARPS missions and exploit the imagery afterwards.

The TARPS shop maintained the cameras and removed or loaded the pod when and if needed. Wet film processing was conducted in a processing room connected to the ship's Intelligence Center (CVIC) where the Intelligence Specialists has a dedicated space with a light table for analyzing the hundreds of feet of film and exploiting the data.

See also 
 Mimeoscope
 Light box
 Exposure unit

References

External links 

 A2 Ultra Thin Artcraft Tracing LED Light Pad Active Area 12.60" X 20.47"
 Making a lightbox
 light box monitor
 table-of-light-with-a-old-monitor

Optical devices